St. Raphael's Cathedral may refer to:

India
St. Raphael's Syro-Malabar Catholic Cathedral, Palakkad, Kerala

Thailand
St. Raphael Cathedral, Surat Thani

United States
St. Raphael's Cathedral (Dubuque, Iowa)
Saint Raphael's Cathedral (Madison, Wisconsin)